This is a list of Mississippian sites. The Mississippian culture was a mound-building Native American culture that flourished in what is now the Midwestern, inland-Eastern, and Southeastern United States from approximately 800 CE to 1500 CE, varying regionally.  Its core area, along the Mississippi River and its major tributaries, stretched from sites such as Cahokia in modern Illinois, the largest of all the Mississippian sites, to Mound Bottom in Tennessee, to the Winterville site in the state of Mississippi. The typical form were earthwork platform mounds, with flat tops, often the sites for temples or elite residences. Other mounds were built in conical or ridge-top forms. The culture reached peoples in settlements across the continent: Temple mound complexes were constructed also in areas ranging from Aztalan in Wisconsin to Crystal River in Florida, and from Fort Ancient, now in Ohio, to Spiro in Oklahoma. Mississippian cultural influences extended as far north and west as modern North Dakota.

See also
 Mississippian culture
 Southeastern Ceremonial Complex
 List of sites and peoples visited by the Hernando de Soto Expedition

References

External links
 Ancient Monument Placemarks

+List
+Mississippian
Mississippian sites
Mississippian sites
Mississippian
Archaeology of the United States
+Mississippian
Native American-related lists